Guillermo Martínez López (born 28 June 1981 in Camagüey) is a Cuban javelin thrower.

In intercontinental competitions, he finished tenth at the 2005 World Championships and ninth at the 2007 World Championships. He also won the gold medal at the 2006 Central American and Caribbean Games and the gold medal at the 2007 Pan American Games

His personal best throw is 87.20 metres, achieved in October 2011 in Guadalajara.

Personal best
Javelin throw: 87.20 m – Guadalajara, Mexico, 28 October 2011

Competition record

Seasonal bests by year
2002 - 75.90
2003 - 75.35
2004 - 81.45
2005 - 84.06
2006 - 87.17
2007 - 85.93
2009 - 86.41
2010 - 86.38
2011 - 87.20
2012 - 82.72
2013 - 85.59
2014 - 79.27
2015 - 75.60

References

External links

Ecured biography (in Spanish)

1981 births
Living people
Cuban male javelin throwers
Olympic athletes of Cuba
Athletes (track and field) at the 2012 Summer Olympics
Pan American Games gold medalists for Cuba
Pan American Games medalists in athletics (track and field)
Athletes (track and field) at the 2007 Pan American Games
Athletes (track and field) at the 2011 Pan American Games
Athletes (track and field) at the 2015 Pan American Games
World Athletics Championships medalists
World Athletics Championships athletes for Cuba
Central American and Caribbean Games gold medalists for Cuba
Competitors at the 2006 Central American and Caribbean Games
Competitors at the 2014 Central American and Caribbean Games
Central American and Caribbean Games medalists in athletics
Medalists at the 2007 Pan American Games
Medalists at the 2011 Pan American Games
21st-century Cuban people